Serafim Pereira Baptista (21 May 1925 – July 2001) was a Portuguese footballer who played as midfielder.

References

External links 
 
 

1925 births
2001 deaths
Portuguese footballers
Association football midfielders
Primeira Liga players
Boavista F.C. players
Portugal international footballers